Carroll County is a county located in the U.S. state of Missouri. As of the 2020 census, the county had a population of 8,495. Its county seat is Carrollton. The county was organized on January 2, 1833, from part of Ray County and named for Charles Carroll of Carrollton, a signer of the Declaration of Independence.

Geography

Adjacent counties
Livingston County  (north)
Chariton County  (east)
Saline County  (southeast)
Lafayette County  (southwest)
Ray County  (west)
Caldwell County  (northwest)

Major highways
 U.S. Route 24
 U.S. Route 65
 Route 10
 Route 139

Demographics

As of the census of 2000, there were 10,285 people, 4,169 households, and 2,880 families residing in the county.  The population density was 15 people per square mile (6/km2).  There were 4,897 housing units at an average density of 7 per square mile (3/km2).  The racial makeup of the county was 96.95% white, 1.72% Black or African American, 0.27% Native American, 0.13% Asian, 0.01% Pacific Islander, 0.14% from other races, and 0.79% from two or more races. Approximately 0.71% of the population were Hispanic or Latino of any race. 32.7% were of German, 25.3% American, 11.8% English and 9.2% Irish ancestry.

There were 4,169 households, out of which 30.20% had children under the age of 18 living with them, 57.40% were married couples living together, 8.00% had a female householder with no husband present, and 30.90% were non-families. 27.80% of all households were made up of individuals, and 15.50% had someone living alone who was 65 years of age or older.  The average household size was 2.42 and the average family size was 2.96.

In the county, the population was spread out, with 25.20% under the age of 18, 7.40% from 18 to 24, 24.50% from 25 to 44, 22.90% from 45 to 64, and 20.10% who were 65 years of age or older.  The median age was 40 years. For every 100 females there were 94.20 males.  For every 100 females age 18 and over, there were 90.40 males.

The median income for a household in the county was $30,643, and the median income for a family was $36,773. Males had a median income of $26,135 versus $17,468 for females. The per capita income for the county was $15,522.  About 9.70% of families and 13.70% of the population were below the poverty line, including 17.00% of those under age 18 and 12.80% of those age 65 or over.

Religion
According to the Association of Religion Data Archives County Membership Report (2010), Carroll County is sometimes regarded as being on the northern edge of the Bible Belt, with evangelical Protestantism being the most predominant religion. The most predominant denominations among residents in Carroll County who adhere to a religion are Southern Baptists (55.73%), United Methodists (11.01%), and Lutherans (LCMS) (9.69%).

2020 Census

Education

Public schools
Bosworth R-V School District – Bosworth
Bosworth Elementary School (PK-06)
Bosworth High School (07-12)
Carrollton R-VII School District – Carrollton
Adams-Dieterich Elementary School (K-04)
Adams Primary School (PK-01)
Carrollton Elementary School (02-04)
Carrollton Middle School (05-08)
Carrollton High School (09-12)
Hale R-I School District – Hale
Hale Elementary School (PK-06)
Hale High School (07-12)
Norborne R-VIII School District – Norborne
Norborne Elementary School (K-05)
Norborne High School (06-12)
Tina-Avalon R-II School District – Tina
Tina-Avalon Elementary School (PK-06)
Tina-Avalon High School (07-12)

Public libraries
Carrollton Public Library  
Norborne Public Library

Politics

Local
The Republican Party predominantly controls politics at the local level in Carroll County. Republicans hold all but three of the elected positions in the county.

State

All of Carroll County is a part of Missouri's 39th District in the Missouri House of Representatives and is currently represented by Peggy McGaugh (R-Carrollton). 

All of Carroll County is a part of Missouri's 21st District in the Missouri Senate and is currently represented by Denny Hoskins (R-Warrensburg).

Federal
All of Carroll County is included in Missouri's 6th Congressional District and is currently represented by Sam Graves (R-Tarkio) in the U.S. House of Representatives. Graves was elected to an eleventh term in 2020 over Democratic challenger Gena Ross.

Carroll County, along with the rest of the state of Missouri, is represented in the U.S. Senate by Josh Hawley (R-Columbia) and Roy Blunt (R-Strafford).

Blunt was elected to a second term in 2016 over then-Missouri Secretary of State Jason Kander.

Political culture

At the presidential level, Carroll County has become solidly Republican in recent years. Carroll County strongly favored Donald Trump in both 2016 and 2020. Bill Clinton was the last Democratic presidential nominee to carry Carroll County in 1996 with a plurality of the vote, and a Democrat hasn't won majority support from the county's voters in a presidential election since Jimmy Carter in 1976.

Like most rural areas throughout Missouri, voters in Carroll County generally adhere to socially and culturally conservative principles which tend to influence their Republican leanings. Despite Carroll County's longstanding tradition of supporting socially conservative platforms, voters in the county have a penchant for advancing populist causes. In 2018, Missourians voted on a proposition (Proposition A) concerning right to work, the outcome of which ultimately reversed the right to work legislation passed in the state the previous year. 63.63% of Carroll County voters cast their ballots to overturn the law.

Missouri presidential preference primaries

2020
The 2020 presidential primaries for both the Democratic and Republican parties were held in Missouri on March 10. On the Democratic side, former Vice President Joe Biden (D-Delaware) both won statewide and carried Carroll County by a wide margin. Biden went on to defeat President Donald Trump in the general election.

Incumbent President Donald Trump (R-Florida) faced a primary challenge from former Massachusetts Governor Bill Weld, but won both Carroll County and statewide by overwhelming margins.

2016
The 2016 presidential primaries for both the Republican and Democratic parties were held in Missouri on March 15. Businessman Donald Trump (R-New York) narrowly won the state overall, but carried a majority of the vote in Carroll County. He went on to win the presidency.

On the Democratic side, former Secretary of State Hillary Clinton (D-New York) narrowly won statewide, but Senator Bernie Sanders (I-Vermont) carried a majority in Carroll County.

2012
The 2012 Missouri Republican Presidential Primary's results were nonbinding on the state's national convention delegates. Voters in Carroll County supported former U.S. Senator Rick Santorum (R-Pennsylvania), who finished first in the state at large, but eventually lost the nomination to former Governor Mitt Romney (R-Massachusetts). Delegates to the congressional district and state conventions were chosen at a county caucus, which selected a delegation favoring Santorum. Incumbent President Barack Obama easily won the Missouri Democratic Primary and renomination. He defeated Romney in the general election.

2008
In 2008, the Missouri Republican Presidential Primary was closely contested, with Senator John McCain (R-Arizona) prevailing and eventually winning the nomination. Carroll County gave McCain his highest vote share of any county in Missouri.

Then-Senator Hillary Clinton (D-New York) received more votes than any candidate from either party in Carroll County during the 2008 presidential primary. Despite initial reports that Clinton had won Missouri, Barack Obama (D-Illinois), also a Senator at the time, narrowly defeated her statewide and later became that year's Democratic nominee, going on to win the presidency.

Communities

Cities

Bogard
Bosworth
Carrollton (county seat)
De Witt
Hale
Norborne

Village
Tina

Unincorporated communities

 Bridge Creek
 Coloma
 Grace
 Little Compton
 Mandeville
 Miami Station
 Miles Point
 Plymouth
 Roads
 Standish
 Stet
 Sugartree
 Wakenda
 White Rock

Townships

Carrollton Township
Cherry Valley Township
Combs Township
De Witt Township
Egypt Township
Eugene Township
Fairfield Township
Hill Township
Hurricane Township
Leslie Township
Moss Creek Township
Prairie Township
Ridge Township
Rockford Township
Stokes Mound Township
Sugartree Township
Trotter Township
Van Horn Township
Wakenda Township
Washington Township

Notable people
 Lewis Eldon Atherton, historian at the University of Missouri
 Amanda Austin, painter and sculptor
 Leon E. Bates, UAW leader
 James Johnson Duderstadt, President of the University of Michigan (1988-1996)
 James Fergason, inventor and business leader in electronics known for work with LCD
 Francis Doyle Gleeson, Roman Catholic bishop
 Don Martin, NFL player and coach
 John C. McQueen, Major general, USMC, decorated veteran of World War II
 James Shields, only person in U.S. history to serve in the United States Senate representing three different states: Illinois (1849-1849; 1849–1855), Minnesota (1858-1859), and Missouri (1879-1879)
 Robert Simpson, athlete
 Barbara Sinatra, wife of Zeppo Marx and later Frank Sinatra
 Claude T. Smith, American band conductor, composer, and educator

See also
 Mormon War (1838)
National Register of Historic Places listings in Carroll County, Missouri

References

Further reading
 Turner, S. K. Twentieth century history of Carroll County, Missouri (2 vol 1911) vol 1 online; vol 2 online

External links
Carroll County Historical Society
 Digitized 1930 Plat Book of Carroll County  from University of Missouri Division of Special Collections, Archives, and Rare Books
 Carroll County Sheriff's Office

 
Missouri counties
1833 establishments in Missouri
Populated places established in 1833